The 2000-01 LEB 2 season was the first season of the LEB 2, second league of the Liga Española de Baloncesto and third division in Spain.

Competition format
16 teams play the regular season. This is a round robin, where each team will play twice against every rival. After the regular season, the eight first qualified teams played a playoff, were the two finalists promoted to LEB.

The last qualified team was relegated to Liga EBA, with the loser of the relegation playoffs, played by the 16th and the 17th qualified teams.

If two or more teams have got the same number of winning games, the criteria of tie-breaking are these:
Head-to-head winning games.
Head-to-head points difference.
Total points difference.

Regular season

League table

Promotion playoffs

Relegation playoffs

MVP of the regular season
 Rahshon Turner (UB La Palma)

External links
LEB Plata website in FEB.es

LEB Plata seasons
LEB3